This article is about the rulers of the historical county and duchy of Guelders.

Counts

House of Wassenberg

 before 1096–about 1129: Gerard I
 about 1129–about 1131: Gerard II, son of Gerard I
 about 1131–1182: Henry I, son of Gerard II
 1182–1207: Otto I, son of Henry I
 1207–1229: Gerard III, son of Otto I
 1229–1271: Otto II, son of Gerard III
 1271–1318: Reginald I, son of Otto II
 1318–1343: Reginald II, son of Reginald I

Dukes

House of Wassenberg

During Reinoud II's reign, the county of Guelders was elevated to a duchy with the Wessenberg-Maccan.

 1318–1343: Reginald II
 1343–1344: Eleanor, wife of Reginald II, regent of Reginald III
 1343–1361: Reginald III, son of Reginald II and Eleanor
 1361–1371: Edward, son of Reginald II
 1371: Reginald III, second time

After the death of Reginald III without issue, two of his half-sisters disputed the succession of the Duchy of Guelders:

1371–1379  Matilde (d. 1384) and her husband, John II, Count of Blois (d. 1381)
1371–1379 Maria (d. 1397) and her husband, William II, Duke of Jülich (d. 1393)

House of Jülich-Hengebach

 1379–1402: William I, son of Maria and William II
 1371–1377: William II, son of William I
 1402–1423: Reginald IV, son of William II

House of Egmond

 1423–1436: John II, nephew of Reginald IV, regent of Arnold
 1423–1465: Arnold, son of John II
 1465–1471: Adolf, son of Arnold
 1471–1473: Arnold, second time

Arnold sold the Duchy of Guelders to Charles I, Duke of Burgundy, who was recognized by the Holy Roman Emperor as Duke of Guelders.

House of Burgundy

 1473–1477: Charles I
 1477–1482: Mary, daughter of Charles I, wife of Maximillian

House of Habsburg

 1477–1482: Maximillian I, ruler jure uxoris
 1482–1492: Philip I, son of Mary and Maximilian I

House of Egmond

The Egmond family did not abandon their claims to Guelders and Charles of Egmond conquered the Duchy in 1492. He remained in power with support of the French king.

 1492–1538: Charles II, son of Adolf

House of La Marck

 1538–1543: William II, distant relative and successor of the House of Egmond

House of Habsburg

 1543–1555: Charles V, son of Philip I
 1555–1598: Philip II, son of Charles V

Guelders in popular culture

William Thatcher, the lead character in the 2001 film A Knight's Tale played by Heath Ledger claimed to be Sir Ulrich von Liechtenstein from Gelderland so as to appear to be of noble birth and thus qualify to participate in jousting.

External links
 
 
 Map of Upper Guelders in 1789 – Northern Part
 Map of Upper Guelders in 1789 – Southern Part

 
 
Guelders
Guelders
Guelders
Ruling families of the Duchy of Guelders

af:Gelre
da:Hertugdømmet Geldern
de:Herzogtum Geldern
li:Hertogdom Gelre